Go for Gold sometimes referred to as Go for the Gold is a film about a runner and the dilemma he faces. He has a choice between the benefits of his sport and what means a lot to him. It stars James Ryan, Cameron Mitchell, M'zwandile Ngxangane, Sandy Horne, Tamara Franke, Brian O'Shaughnessy and Patricia Sanders. It was directed by Stuart F. Fleming.

Story
Johnny (Played by James Ryan) lives at home with his mother and stepfather who is a physically abusive man. Two things that mean a lot to him are his girlfriend Trish and his running. He has a solid influence in his friend Victor (played by M'zwandile Ngxangane) who is a champion runner. He comes to the attention of Phillip Pritchard (Played by Cameron Mitchell) who is a business man.
The runner risks losing the things that are dear to him, as Pritchard who is his ticket to success is forcing him to choose between them and fame and fortune.

Background
It was released on  Vestron Video International. It was released in both Beta and VHS formats.
It was released in Germany under the title of Skrupellose Verlierer which runs at 89 minutes. In Belgium and The Netherlands, the video release ran at 95 minutes.  The British Board of Film Classification rated it as suitable for ages 15 and above.

Hope Holiday who was co-producer for the film had previously been connected Cameron Mitchell in The Hughes Mystery, Killpoint and Low Blow.

Reviews and commentry
The 1998 edition of  Blockbuster Entertainment Guide gave it a 3 star rating and said that it was well acted and often moving. Rotten Tomatoes commented on Cameron Mitchell's supporting role being effective and for a change non-villainous.

Cast
 James Ryan   ...  Johnny Morris 
 Cameron Mitchell   ...  Phillip Pritchard 
 M'zwandile Ngxangane   ...  Victor Sabaka 
 Sandra Horne   ...  Trish Palmer 
 Tamara Franke   ...  Sandra Pritchard 
 Brian O'Shaughnessy   ...  Stan Hopkins 
 Patricia Sanders   ...  Johnny's mom 
 George Korelin   ...  Sam 
 Fred Wheeler   ...  Fritz 
 Morrison Gampu   ... Victor's father 
 Dennis Smith  ...  TV interviewer  
 Zipporah Benn   ...  Phillip's secretary 
 Larry Taylor   ...  Desk clerk 
 Heine Toerien   ...  Club member

References

External links
 Imdb: Go for the Gold

Films set in South Africa
1980s English-language films